The 1922 Glamorgan County Council election to Glamorgan County Council, south Wales, took place in March 1922. It was preceded by the 1919 election and followed by the 1925 election.

Overview of the Result
By the early 1920s, the Labour Party was making significant progress in Glamorgan, capturing the majority of the parliamentary constituencies. This was reflected in the county council elections of 1919, when Labour with 40 out of 66 councillors and 11 of the 22 aldermen secured a majority on the County Council for the first time. In 1922 it suffered a minor setback, causing the Western Mail to gleefully report that the party had been "routed once again" owing to a number of individual losses. However, Labour still had a commanding majority following the election.

Boundary Changes
There were no boundary changes but some wards were given different names to those used in 1918. Garw Valley ward was known in 1922 as Pontycymmer and the Llantrisant ward as Pontyclun. Margam ward appears to have been divided into two, named Port Talbot East and Port Talbot West.

Candidates
At least 32 candidates were returned unopposed.

A number of retiring aldermen sought re-election. W.H. Davies (Lib, Cilfynydd), Hopkin Morgan (Lib, Neath North) and the Rev William Saunders (Lab, Garw Valley) were returned unopposed.

Contested Elections
At least 32 councillors were returned unopposed. Most of the contested elections featured a Labour candidate facing one opponent, whether Conservative, Liberal or Independent. In the Ogmore Valley ward an unusual situation arose where two Labour candidates faced each other, with the railwaymen opposing the nominated candidate of the SWMF

Outcome
In contrast to the 1919 election, Labour suffered a minor setback at the election with a net loss of four seats. Several of these were high-profile contests. At Bargoed, Walter Lewis failed to hold the seat recently vacated by Morgan Jones when he was elected MP for Caerphilly. At Mountain Ash, the wartime pacifist Emrys Hughes failed to dislodge the sitting Liberal councillor while prominent miners' leaders Meth Jones and Ted Williams fell short at Port Talbot and Bridgend respectively. Labour also lost the Gower seat which was a surprise gain three years earlier. Overall, however, Labour was still in the ascendancy.

Results

Aberaman

Aberavon

Abercynon

Aberdare Town

Bargoed
Walter Lewis failed to hold the seat previously held by Morgan Jones MP.

Barry

Barry Dock

Blaengwawr

Bridgend

Briton Ferry

Cadoxton

Caerphilly

Cilfynydd

Coedffranc

Coity

Cowbridge

Cwm Aber

Cwmavon

Cymmer
Morgan Williams held the seat he had represented for twenty years without opposition.

Dinas Powys

Dulais Valley

Ferndale

Gadlys

Glyncorrwg

Gower

Hengoed

Hopkinstown

Kibbor

Llandaff

Llandeilo Talybont

Llanfabon

Llwydcoed

Llwynypia

Loughor

Maesteg, Caerau and Nantyffyllon

Maesteg, East and West

Mountain Ash
The ward was known as Duffryn in 1922.

Neath (North)

Neath (South)

Newcastle

Ogmore Valley

Penarth North

Penarth South

Penrhiwceiber

Pentre

Pontardawe

Pontyclun

Port Talbot East
The ward was known as Margam North and Central in 1922.

Port Talbot West
The ward was known as Margam West in 1922.

Porthcawl

Pontlottyn
No nominations were received for this ward where William Hammond (Lab) was the retiring member.

Pontycymmer
The sitting councillor, Jonathan Maddocks (Ind) withdrew, allowing the retiring Labour alderman to be returned unopposed.

Pontypridd

Penygraig

Porth

Swansea Valley

Tonyrefail and Gilfach Goch

Trealaw

Treforest

Treherbert

Treorchy
Thomas Jones, Co-operative stores manager, was returned unopposed.

Tylorstown

Vale of Neath

Ynyshir

Ystalyfera
D.W. Davies regained the seat he lost three years previously.

Ystrad

Election of Aldermen
In addition to the elected councillors the County Council consisted of 22 county aldermen. Aldermen were elected by the council, and served a six-year term. Following the 1922 election, there were eleven Aldermanic vacancies, which were filled at the annual meeting by re-electing all eleven retiring aldermen.

Thomas Luther Davies (Lib, Aberaman)
William Roberts Davies (Lib, Cilfynydd)
Hubert Jenkins (Lab, Cwm Aber)
Henry Lewis (Con, Kibbor)
Hopkin Morgan (Lib, Neath)
Rev William Saunders (Lab, Garw Valley)
David Thomas Williams (Lab, Swansea Valley)
Enoch Davies (Lib, Rhondda)
James Evans (Lib, Rhondda)
Morgan Williams (Lib, Rhondda)
James Norris (Lab, Rhondda)

By-elections
Eleven vacancies were caused by the election of aldermen.

Aberaman by-election

Cwm Aber by-election
Rev D.M. Jones, who stood down in favour of Alderman Hubert Jenkins, was returned unopposed.

Cilfynydd by-election

Cymmer by-election

Garw Valley by-election

Kibbor by-election
H. Spence Thomas, who stood down in favour of Alderman Henry Lewis, was returned unopposed.

Llwynypia by-election

Neath North by-election

Rhondda by-election

Swansea Valley by-election

Treherbert by-election

Notes

References

Bibliography

1922
1922 Welsh local elections
1920s in Glamorgan